Bottled Passion is a Hong Kong television drama produced by Television Broadcasts Limited (TVB) under executive producer Lee Tim-shing. The drama premiered on Jade and HD Jade channels on 6 December 2011 and ended its run on 2 January 2012 with a total of 21 episodes. The Chinese title literally translates to "My Ideal Cruel Husband" (Cantonese Yale: ngo5 dik1 yu4 yi3 long4 gwan1), with a wordplay on the words "long4 gwan1" (郎君), meaning "husband" or "pimp", and "long4" (狼), meaning "cruel" or "cunning".

Synopsis
Tung Kwok Hing (Rebecca Chan) adopted an orphan and claimed he was Ko Yi Ho (Raymond Wong), the illegitimate child that her husband Ko Siu Tong (Samuel Kwok) had been searching for many years. Tong believed Ho was more suitable than his oldest son Ko Yi Tai (Joel Chan) to be his successor, which later led Mrs. Ko's discontent. Eventually Ho was kicked out of the family, leaving him homeless. Living out alone, Ho got a taste of the bitterness in life and was determined to return home and take revenge on his adopted family under a different name Tung Bun Sin. Under his new identity, he vowed to give them a taste of losing their loved ones. Meanwhile, he runs into the naive, trusting Tsui Sum (Niki Chow), who had just taken over her family business. Seeing an opportunity, Ho deceives Tsui Sum of her family business and all her family's money in order to get closer to the Ko family. However, old ties, secrets, and memories of a childhood sweetheart come back to haunt him. Eventually Ho embarks on a road that threatens the lives of all he holds dear, and the life of the only woman he's ever loved.

Cast

The Ko Family

The Tsui Family

The Hui Family

Minor characters

Viewership ratings

International Broadcast
  - 8TV (Malaysia)

References

External links
Official Website 
K-TVB.net

TVB dramas
2011 Hong Kong television series debuts
2012 Hong Kong television series endings
Hong Kong television shows
Period television series